23 Oakhill Road is a Grade II listed house in Oakhill Road, Putney, London SW15.

It was built in 1879, by the architect William Young, as his own house. He died at 23 Oakhill Road in 1900.

See also
 25 Oakhill Road

References 

Houses in the London Borough of Wandsworth
Grade II listed buildings in the London Borough of Wandsworth
Grade II listed houses in London
Houses completed in 1879